Thirteen ships of the Royal Navy have borne the name HMS Delight:

  was a discovery vessel wrecked in 1583 off Sable Island.  She may not have been part of the Royal Navy, and was possibly part of Sir Humphrey Gilbert's 1583 expedition to Newfoundland.
  was a four-gun hoy purchased in 1686 and sold in 1713.
  was a 14-gun sixth-rate launched in 1709 and sold in 1712.
  was a 14-gun sloop launched in 1778 and foundered in 1781.
 HMS Delight (1801) was an 18-gun sloop, formerly the French corvette Sans Pareille.
  was a 16-gun brig-sloop launched in 1806 and captured by the French in 1808 when she became stranded off Calabria.
 HMS Delight was a 16-gun brig, formerly the French brig Friedland, name vessel of her class of six brigs.  captured her in 1808; Delight was paid off in 1810 and sold in 1814.
  was a 10-gun brig-sloop of the  launched in 1819 and wrecked in 1824 with the loss of her entire crew. She had been carrying some 103 slaves that she had rescued from Providence Island where they had been stranded when the French brig Lys had wrecked there.
  was another 10-gun Cherokee-class brig-sloop launched in 1829 and sold in 1844.
  was a wood screw  launched in 1856 and sold in 1867.  She was later renamed M. A. Starr.
  was a D-class destroyer launched in 1932 and sunk in 1940.
 HMS Delight was to have been a destroyer, ordered in 1945, but cancelled the following year.
  was a  destroyer launched in 1950.  She was previously to have been named HMS Disdain, but was renamed in 1946 prior to launching.  She was sold in 1970.

Citations and references

Citations

References

Royal Navy ship names